An observatory is a location used for observing terrestrial, marine, or celestial events. Astronomy, climatology/meteorology, geophysical, oceanography and volcanology are examples of disciplines for which observatories have been constructed. Historically, observatories were as simple as containing an astronomical sextant (for measuring the distance between stars) or Stonehenge (which has some alignments on astronomical phenomena).

Astronomical observatories

Astronomical observatories are mainly divided into four categories: space-based, airborne, ground-based, and underground-based.

Ground-based observatories

Ground-based observatories, located on the surface of Earth, are used to make observations in the radio and visible light portions of the electromagnetic spectrum. Most optical telescopes are housed within a dome or similar structure, to protect the delicate instruments from the elements. Telescope domes have a slit or other opening in the roof that can be opened during observing, and closed when the telescope is not in use. In most cases, the entire upper portion of the telescope dome can be rotated to allow the instrument to observe different sections of the night sky. Radio telescopes usually do not have domes.

For optical telescopes, most ground-based observatories are located far from major centers of population, to avoid the effects of light pollution. The ideal locations for modern observatories are sites that have dark skies, a large percentage of clear nights per year, dry air, and are at high elevations. At high elevations, the Earth's atmosphere is thinner, thereby minimizing the effects of atmospheric turbulence and resulting in better astronomical "seeing". Sites that meet the above criteria for modern observatories include the southwestern United States, Hawaii, Canary Islands, the Andes, and high mountains in Mexico such as Sierra Negra. Major optical observatories include Mauna Kea Observatory and Kitt Peak National Observatory in the US, Roque de los Muchachos Observatory  in Spain, and Paranal Observatory and Cerro Tololo Inter-American Observatory in Chile.

Specific research study performed in 2009 shows that the best possible location for ground-based observatory on Earth is Ridge A — a place in the central part of Eastern Antarctica. This location provides the least atmospheric disturbances and best visibility.

Radio observatories
Beginning in 1930s, radio telescopes have been built for use in the field of radio astronomy to observe the Universe in the radio portion of the electromagnetic spectrum. Such an instrument, or collection of instruments, with supporting facilities such as control centres, visitor housing, data reduction centers, and/or maintenance facilities are called radio observatories. Radio observatories are similarly located far from major population centers to avoid electromagnetic interference (EMI) from radio, TV, radar, and other EMI emitting devices, but unlike optical observatories, radio observatories can be placed in valleys for further EMI shielding. Some of the world's major radio observatories include the Very Large Array in New Mexico, United States, Jodrell Bank in the UK, Arecibo in Puerto Rico, Parkes in New South Wales, Australia, and Chajnantor in Chile.

Highest astronomical observatories

Since the mid-20th century, a number of astronomical observatories have been constructed at very high altitudes, above . The largest and most notable of these is the Mauna Kea Observatory, located near the summit of a  volcano in Hawaiʻi. It has now been surpassed by the new University of Tokyo Atacama Observatory, an optical-infrared telescope on a remote  mountaintop in the Atacama Desert of Chile.

Oldest astronomical observatories

The oldest proto-observatories, in the sense of an observation post for astronomy,

 Wurdi Youang, Australia
 Zorats Karer, Karahunj, Armenia
 Loughcrew, Ireland
 Newgrange, Ireland
 Stonehenge, Great Britain
 Chankillo, Peru
 El Caracol, Mexico
 Abu Simbel, Egypt
 Kokino, Kumanovo, North Macedonia
 Observatory at Rhodes, Greece
 Goseck circle, Germany
 Ujjain, India
 Arkaim, Russia
 Cheomseongdae, South Korea
 Angkor Wat, Cambodia

The oldest true observatories, in the sense of a specialized research institute, include:
 825 AD: Al-Shammisiyyah observatory, Baghdad, Iraq
 869: Mahodayapuram Observatory, Kerala, India
 1259: Maragheh observatory, Azerbaijan, Iran
 1276: Gaocheng Astronomical Observatory, China
 1420: Ulugh Beg Observatory, Samarqand, Uzbekistan
 1442: Beijing Ancient Observatory, China
 1577: Constantinople Observatory of Taqi ad-Din, Turkey
 1580: Uraniborg, Denmark
 1581: Stjerneborg, Denmark
 1633: Leiden Observatory, Netherlands
 1642: Panzano Observatory, Italy
 1642: Round Tower, Denmark
 1667: Paris Observatory, France
 1675: Royal Greenwich Observatory, England
 1695: Sukharev Tower, Russia
 1711: Berlin Observatory, Germany
 1724: Jantar Mantar, India
 1753: Stockholm Observatory, Sweden
 1753: Vilnius University Observatory, Lithuania
 1753: Real Instituto y Observatorio de la Armada, Spain
 1759: Trieste Observatory, Italy.
 1757: Macfarlane Observatory, Scotland.
 1759: Turin Observatory, Italy.
 1764: Brera Astronomical Observatory, Italy.
 1765: Mohr Observatory, Indonesia.
 1771: Lviv Observatory, Ukraine.
 1774: Observatory of the Vatican, Italy.
 1785: Dunsink Observatory, Ireland.
 1786: Madras Observatory, India.
 1789: Armagh Observatory, Northern Ireland.
 1790: Royal Observatory of Madrid, Spain,
 1803: National Astronomical Observatory, Bogotá, Colombia.
 1811: Tartu Old Observatory, Estonia
 1812: Astronomical Observatory of Capodimonte, Naples, Italy
 1830/1842: Depot of Charts & Instruments/US Naval Observatory, USA
 1830: Yale University Observatory Atheneum, USA
 1834: Helsinki University Observatory, Finland
 1838: Hopkins Observatory, Williams College, USA
 1838: Loomis Observatory, Western Reserve Academy, USA
 1839: Pulkovo Observatory, Russia
 1839/1847: Harvard College Observatory, USA
 1842: Cincinnati Observatory, USA
 1844: Georgetown University Astronomical Observatory, USA
 1854: Detroit Observatory, USA
 1873: Quito Astronomical Observatory, Ecuador
 1878: Lisbon Astronomical Observatory, Portugal
 1884: McCormick Observatory, USA
 1888: Lick Observatory, USA
 1890: Smithsonian Astrophysical Observatory, USA
 1894: Lowell Observatory, USA
 1895: Theodor Jacobsen Observatory, USA
 1897: Yerkes Observatory, USA
 1899: Kodaikanal Solar Observatory, India

Space-based observatories

Space-based observatories are telescopes or other instruments that are located in outer space, many in orbit around the Earth. Space telescopes can be used to observe astronomical objects at wavelengths of the electromagnetic spectrum that cannot penetrate the Earth's atmosphere and are thus impossible to observe using ground-based telescopes. The Earth's atmosphere is opaque to ultraviolet radiation, X-rays, and gamma rays and is partially opaque to infrared radiation so observations in these portions of the electromagnetic spectrum are best carried out from a location above the atmosphere of our planet. Another advantage of space-based telescopes is that, because of their location above the Earth's atmosphere, their images are free from the effects of atmospheric turbulence that plague ground-based observations. As a result, the angular resolution of space telescopes such as the Hubble Space Telescope is often much smaller than a ground-based telescope with a similar aperture. However, all these advantages do come with a price. Space telescopes are much more expensive to build than ground-based telescopes. Due to their location, space telescopes are also extremely difficult to maintain. The Hubble Space Telescope was able to be serviced by the Space Shuttles while many other space telescopes cannot be serviced at all.

Airborne observatories

Airborne observatories have the advantage of height over ground installations, putting them above most of the Earth's atmosphere. They also have an advantage over space telescopes: The instruments can be deployed, repaired and updated much more quickly and inexpensively. The Kuiper Airborne Observatory and the Stratospheric Observatory for Infrared Astronomy use airplanes to observe in the infrared, which is absorbed by water vapor in the atmosphere. High-altitude balloons for X-ray astronomy have been used in a variety of countries.

Volcano observatories

A volcano observatory is an institution that conducts the monitoring of a volcano as well as research in order to understand the potential impacts of active volcanism. Among the best known are the Hawaiian Volcano Observatory and the Vesuvius Observatory. Mobile volcano observatories exist with the USGS VDAP (Volcano Disaster Assistance Program), to be deployed on demand. Each volcano observatory has a geographic area of responsibility it is assigned to whereby the observatory is tasked with spreading activity forecasts, analyzing potential volcanic activity threats and cooperating with communities in preparation for volcanic eruption.

See also

 Equatorial room
 Fundamental station
 Ground station
 List of astronomical observatories
 List of observatory codes
 List of telescope parts and construction
 Observatory Street, Oxford, England
 Science tourism
 Space telescope
 Telescope
 Timeline of telescopes, observatories, and observing technology
 Weather observatory for weather forecasting
 Research station

References

Further reading
 Aubin, David; Charlotte Bigg, and H. Otto Sibum, eds. The Heavens on Earth: Observatories and Astronomy in Nineteenth-Century Science and Culture (Duke University Press; 2010) 384 pages; Topics include astronomy as military science in Sweden, the Pulkovo Observatory in the Russia of Czar Nicholas I, and physics and the astronomical community in late 19th-century America.
 Brunier, Serge, et al. Great Observatories of the World (2005)
 Dick, Steven. Sky and Ocean Joined: The U.S. Naval Observatory 1830–2000 (2003)
 Gressot Julien and Jeanneret Romain, « Determining the right time, or the establishment of a culture of astronomical precision at Neuchâtel Observatory in the mid-19th century », Journal for the History of Astronomy, 53(1), 2022, 27–48, https://doi.org/10.1177/00218286211068572
 Leverington, David. Observatories and Telescopes of Modern Times - Ground-Based Optical and Radio Astronomy Facilities since 1945. Cambridge University Press, Cambridge 2016, .
 McCray, W. Patrick. Giant Telescopes: Astronomical Ambition and the Promise of Technology (2004); focuses on the Gemini Observatory.
 Sage, Leslie, and Gail Aschenbrenner. A Visitor's Guide to the Kitt Peak Observatories (2004)

External links

 Western Visayas Local Urban Observatory (archived 19 September 2008)
 Dearborn Observatory Records, Northwestern University Archives, Evanston, Illinois (archived 4 September 2015)
 Coordinates and satellite images of astronomical observatories on Earth
 Milkyweb Astronomical Observatory Guide world's largest database of astronomical observatories since 2000about 2000 entries
 List of amateur and professional observatories in North America with custom weather forecasts
 Map showing many of the Astronomical Observatories around the world (with drilldown links)
 Mt. Wilson Observatory

 
Scientific organizations
Scientific observation
Scientific buildings